The Borisa Sitting Buddha is located at the east slope of Namsan Mountain in Gyeongju, Korea. This site is
supposed to be the place where Borisa temple had stood during the Silla period. The stone sculpture is 4.36m high, and the seated Buddha image itself is as high as 2.44m. Among the existing Buddhist images
on Mt. Namsan, this image is best preserved. The Buddha sitting on the octagonal lotus pedestal is the image of Sakyamuni, who smiles at the world with the half-closed eyes and a merciful facial expression.
Small Buddhist images and floral medallion designs are carved on the halo. On the back of the pear-shaped halo, the Bhaisajyaguru Buddhaup-holding a medicine bowl in his left hand is carved in relief.

Treasure No. 136

Location: 66-1-san, Baeban-dong, Gyeongju-si, Gyeongsangbuk-do

References

External links

 

Silla
Buildings and structures in Gyeongju
Historic Sites of South Korea
Tourist attractions in Gyeongju
Buddha statues